Svobodny Trud (lit. free labor) is the name of several rural localities in Russia:
Svobodny Trud, Republic of Adygea, a village (khutor) in the Republic of Adygea
Svobodny Trud, Amur Oblast, a village (selo) in Amur Oblast
Svobodny Trud, name of several other rural localities